John Marsden (born 27 September 1950) is an Australian writer and alternative school principal. Marsden's books have been translated into eleven languages.

While working as a teacher, Marsden began writing for children, and had his first book, So Much to Tell You, published in 1987. Since then, he has written or edited over 40 books and has sold over 5 million books throughout the world. 

In 2006, Marsden started an alternative school, Candlebark School in the Macedon Ranges. Marsden has since reduced his writing to focus on teaching and running the school. In 2016, he opened the arts-focused secondary school, Alice Miller School, also in the Macedon Ranges. He is also the patron of youth media organisation Express Media. He has no academic education in pedagogy and is not state licensed.

Early life
Marsden was born in Victoria and spent the first 10 years of his life living in the country towns of Kyneton, Victoria, and Devonport, Tasmania. He is a great-great-great-great nephew of colonial Anglican clergyman and magistrate Rev. Samuel Marsden. When he was 10 years old, Marsden moved to Sydney and attended The King's School, Parramatta. Marsden was accepted into Sydney University to study a double degree in Law and Arts, but eventually dropped out. He has worked at different jobs, including an abattoir, working in a mortuary, delivering pizzas, working as a motorbike courier, working as a nightwatchman, selling encyclopaedias, and working with chickens.

Writing career

Early career
While working at the prestigious Geelong Grammar School's Timbertop campus as an English teacher, Marsden made the decision to write for teenagers, following his dissatisfaction with his students' apathy towards reading, or the observation that teenagers simply weren't reading anymore. Marsden then wrote So Much to Tell You in only three weeks, and the book was published in 1987. The book sold record numbers and won numerous awards including "Book of the Year" as awarded by the Children's Book Council of Australia (CBCA).

In the five years following the publication of So Much To Tell You, Marsden published six more books. Notable works from this period are Out of Time, which was nominated by the CBCA as a notable book for older readers, and Letters From the Inside and a sequel to So Much to Tell You called Take My Word For It, which were both shortlisted for the CBCA's Children's Book of the Year: Older Readers award. Upon publication in the United States, Letters From the Inside received accolades from The Horn Book Magazine and the American Library Association. American novelist Robert Cormier found the novel "unforgettable" and described John Marsden as a "major writer deserving of world-wide acclaim".

Later career

In 1993, Marsden published Tomorrow, When the War Began, the first book in the Tomorrow series and his most acclaimed and best-selling work to date. Marsden went on to write seven books in the Tomorrow series, together with a follow-up trilogy, The Ellie Chronicles, despite originally intending for the entire series to only consist of a trilogy.

At the same time as writing the Tomorrow series, Marsden wrote several other novels such as Checkers, edited works such as This I Believe, wrote children's picture books such as The Rabbits, poetry such as Prayer for the Twenty-First Century, and non-fiction works such as Everything I Know About Writing and Secret Men's Business.

Themes
Marsden's earlier works are largely novels aimed at teenage or young adult audience. Common themes in Marsden's works include sexuality, violence in society, survival at school and in a harsh world, and conflict with adult authority figures. However, Marsden also has declared that he wishes to write about "things that have always been important for humans... [such as] love, for a start. And the absence of love. The way people relate to each other. The way people solve problems. Courage. Spirit. The human spirit."

Awards and commendations
Marsden has won every major writing award in Australia for young people's fiction including what Marsden describes as one of the highlights of his career, the 2006 Lloyd O'Neil Award for contributions to Australian publishing. This award means that Marsden is one of only five authors to be honoured for lifelong services to the Australian book industry. John Marsden was also nominated for the Astrid Lindgren Memorial Award in 2008, the world's largest children's and youth literature award and the second largest literature prize in the world.

Internationally, he has twice been named among Best Books of the Year by the American Library Association and once by Publishers' Weekly (USA), has been runner-up for Dutch Children's Book of the Year and short-listed for the German Young Readers' Award, won the Grand Jury Prize as Austria's Most Popular Writer for Teenagers, and won the coveted Buxtehude Bull in Germany. However, despite his number of awards, Marsden has said that he generally does not care about awards (with the exception of the Lloyd O'Neil Award and The Melbourne Prize for Literature).

In 1996, Marsden's books took the top six places on the Teenage Fiction best-seller lists for Australia. Also in 1996, he was named "Australia's most popular author today in any literary field" by The Australian. In 1997, Australian readers voted three of his books into Australia's 100 most-loved books of all time.

In 2014, Lyndon Terracini announced that Opera Australia had co-commissioned Kate Miller-Heidke to write an opera based on Marsden's The Rabbits. The work, The Rabbits, premiered in 2015 in Perth, and was staged in Melbourne, Sydney, and Brisbane, winning several awards.

In December 2018, Marsden was awarded the Dromkeen Medal, in recognition of his outstanding achievement in children’s and young adult literature.

Published works and awards

The Tomorrow series

Other works

References

External links

 
 Candlebark school
 Works at Open Library

1950 births
Place of birth missing (living people)
20th-century Australian novelists
21st-century Australian novelists
Australian children's writers
Australian male novelists
Australian people of English descent
Australian writers of young adult literature
Living people
People educated at Geelong Grammar School
Writers from Melbourne
People educated at The King's School, Parramatta
20th-century Australian male writers
21st-century Australian male writers
Australian headmasters